Garry White may refer to:

Garry Michael White, American playwright and screenwriter
Garry White (American football), on List of Minnesota Golden Gophers in the NFL Draft
Garry White (musician) in Homelands (festival)

See also
Gary White (disambiguation)